Eolagurus is a genus of rodent in the family Cricetidae. It contains the following species:
 Yellow steppe lemming (Eolagurus luteus)
 Przewalski's steppe lemming (Eolagurus przewalskii)

References

 
Rodent genera
Taxonomy articles created by Polbot